was a Japanese manga artist. She was the first woman to be published in the manga magazine Garo and its only regular female comic artist.

History
Tsurika began drawing manga as a teenager and submitting her work to magazine contests, but it was not well received in part because women were expected to create shoujo romance stories, not action stories. One editor wrote "I would recommend you stick with subject matter that you’re familiar with and draw about girls instead.”. She later found success publishing in the alternative manga magazine Garo. 

Tsurika died of complications from lupus in 1985 at the age of 37.

Style and Themes
Many of Tsurika's manga were in gekiga style. 

Tsurika's work explores and subverts themes of women's gender roles and patriarchal ideas of femininity, gender identity, and sexuality. Some of her work feature androgynous or gender nonconforming self-cameos.

Tsurika has a varied visual style, ranging from sparse simple drawings that make use of blank space to elaborate scenes inspired by Pop Art and Art Nouveau.

Works
This list may not be comprehensive.

Collections in Japanese
 フライト : つりたくにこ作品集 (Flight: The Works of Kuniko Tsurita). Seirin Kōgeisha, 2010.
  彼方へ : つりたくにこ未発表作品集 (Beyond: Unpublished works of Kuniko Tsurita). Seirin Kōgeisha, 2001.
  六の宮姫子の悲劇 (The Tragedy of Princess Rokunomiya). Seirin Kōgeisha, 2001.

Translated Collections
 Flight has been translated into:
  Italian by V. Filosa. Coconino Press, 2019. 
 French by Léopold Dahan. Atrabile. 2021 
 The Sky is Blue with a Single Cloud, translated by Ryan Holmberg. Drawn & Quarterly Publications, 2020.

Notes

External links

Manga artists
Women manga artists
Japanese female comics artists
Female comics writers
20th-century Japanese women writers
1947 births
1985 deaths